Hieronymus Angerianus (Gerolamo or Girolamo Angeriano) (c. 1480 but disputed [see below] –1535) was an influential Italian neo-Latin poet from Apulia. He retired at a young age from the life of the Neapolitan court, to the family estates at Ariano di Puglia.

His Erōtoπαιγνιον (Erotopaegnion), an epigram collection, was published in 1512 in Florence. He was published in 1582 in the Poetae Tres Elegantissimi (Paris), with Joannes Secundus and Michelle Marullo.

Sources differ considerably on his birth year, with some stating 1470, others giving "c. 1480" and another c. 1490.

English literature
His influence has been traced in Giles Fletcher. He was later translated by Walter Harte and Thomas Moore.

References
Allan M. Wilson (editor) (1995), The Erotopaegnion: A Trifling Book of Love of Girolamo Angeriano

Notes

15th-century births
1535 deaths
Italian poets
Italian male poets
Writers from Naples
People from Ariano Irpino
16th-century Neapolitan people